Sunčica Čanić is a Croatian-American mathematician, the Hugh Roy and Lillie Cranz Cullen Distinguished Professor of Mathematics and Director of the Center for Mathematical Biosciences at the University of Houston, and Professor of Mathematics at the University of California, Berkeley. She is known for her work in mathematically modeling the human cardiovascular system and medical devices for it.

Education and career
Čanić earned bachelor's and master's degrees in mathematics in 1984 and 1986 from the University of Zagreb. She completed her Ph.D. in 1992 in applied mathematics from Stony Brook University, under the joint supervision of Bradley J. Plohr and James Glimm. She became an assistant professor at Iowa State University in 1992, and moved to the University of Houston in 1998. She became the Cullen Distinguished Professor in 2008, and Professor of Mathematics at U.C. Berkeley in 2018. She is also a member of the board of governors of the Institute for Mathematics and its Applications.

Contributions
Čanić's research has involved the computational simulation of the stents used to treat arterial clogging. By finding ways of simplifying computer models of stents from hundreds of thousands of nodes to only 400 nodes, she was able to make these simulations much more efficient, and used them to design improved stents that reduce clotting and scar formation. She has also led the development of a procedure for heart valve replacement surgery that is less traumatic than open-heart surgery.

Recognition
In 2014 she was elected as a fellow of the Society for Industrial and Applied Mathematics "for contributions to the modeling and analysis of partial differential equations motivated by applications in the life sciences."
She was elected as a Fellow of the American Mathematical Society in the 2020 Class, for "contributions to partial differential equations, and for mathematical modeling of fluid-structure interactions that has influenced the design of medical devices".

References

External links
 

Year of birth missing (living people)
Living people
20th-century American mathematicians
21st-century American mathematicians
Croatian mathematicians
American women mathematicians
Faculty of Science, University of Zagreb alumni
Stony Brook University alumni
Iowa State University faculty
University of Houston faculty
Fellows of the American Mathematical Society
Fellows of the Society for Industrial and Applied Mathematics
20th-century women mathematicians
21st-century women mathematicians
20th-century American women
21st-century American women